Rhinella stanlaii is a species of toad in the family Bufonidae. It is endemic to Bolivia and occurs on the Amazonian versant of the Bolivian Andes in the Cochabamba, La Paz, and Santa Cruz departments.

It can occur in disturbed habitats. It is not an uncommon species. It is not facing known significant threats. It occurs in a number of protected areas.

References

stanlaii
Amphibians of Bolivia
Endemic fauna of Bolivia
Amphibians described in 2000
Taxonomy articles created by Polbot